Guile may refer to:

 Astuteness, deception.
 GNU Guile, an implementation of the Scheme programming language
 Guile (Street Fighter), a video game character from the Street Fighter series
 Guile (Chrono Cross), a video game character from Chrono Cross
 Guile Island, Antarctica
 Guilé Foundation, a Swiss organisation for business ethics

People with the surname
 Melanie Guile (born 1949), Australian writer

See also
 Guille (disambiguation)